Phalonidia latifasciana is a species of moth of the family Tortricidae. It is found in China (Jilin, Sichuan), Japan, Korea and Russia.

The wingspan is 12−18 mm.

References

Moths described in 1970
Phalonidia